Carlo Pedersoli Jr. (born June 8, 1993) is an Italian mixed martial artist and competes in Welterweight division. A professional mixed martial artist since 2014, Pedersoli has also fought in the Ultimate Fighting Championship and Bellator MMA.

Background 
Pedersoli was born in Miami, Florida, United States to an Italian father (Giuseppe Pedersoli) and a Panamanian mother, and his paternal grandfather is Bud Spencer (Carlo Pedersoli), an Italian actor, Olympic swimmer and professional water polo player. Pedersoli started training goju-ryu and shotokan karate and boxing at young age. At the age of sixteen, he tried a few session of mma training at his uncle garage, he enrolled himself in a mma and krav maga classes as well as started playing American football in the Roman sport club Grizzleys, helping the club winning Rome championships. After a few successes in mma fights, he decided to devote himself fully in mma and compete professionally.

Mixed martial arts career

Early career 
Pedersoli fought in the European circuit for three and half years and amassed a record of 10–1, with seven fight winning streak, prior joining UFC.

Ultimate Fighting Championship 

Pedersoli made his promotion debut on May 27, 2018, at UFC Fight Night: Thompson vs. Till against Bradley Scott.  He won the fight via split decision.

On September 22, 2018, replacing Santiago Ponzinibbio, Pedersoli faced Alex Oliveira at UFC Fight Night: Santos vs. Anders. He lost the fight via knockout in round one.

Pedersoli faced Dwight Grant on February 23, 2019, at UFC Fight Night 145. He lost the fight via technical knockout in round one.

Post UFC 
After the loss against Dwight Grant, Pedersoli was released from the UFC and subsequently signed by Bellator MMA. He made his debut on October 3, 2020, at Bellator Milan 3 against Acoidan Duque. He lost the back-and-forth fight by unanimous decision.

After winning two bouts on the Italian regional scene in 2021, Pedersoli appeared at Cage Warriors 144 on October 7, 2022 against Madars Fleminas. He won the bout in the second round after reversing Fleminas on the ground and submitting him via rear-naked choke.

Personal life 
Pedersoli studied Sport Science in Rome, Italy.

Mixed martial arts record 

|-
|Win
|align=center|14–4
|Madars Fleminas
|Submission (rear-naked choke)
|Cage Warriors 144
|
|align=center|2
|align=center|3:37
|Rome, Italy
|
|-
|Win
|align=center|13–4
|Anatoly Safronov
|TKO (body kick)
|TGC 4
|
|align=center|1
|align=center|1:27
|Mazara del Vallo, Italy
|
|-
|Win
|align=center|12–4
|Cristian Corujo
|KO (punch)
|Messapicum Fighting Championship 4
|
|align=center|1
|align=center|0:49
|Manduria, Italy
|
|-
|Loss
|align=center|11–4
|Acoidan Duque
|Decision (unanimous)
|Bellator Milan 3
|
|align=center|3
|align=center|5:00
|Milan, Italy
|
|-
|Loss
|align=center|11–3
|Dwight Grant
|TKO (punches)
|UFC Fight Night: Błachowicz vs. Santos
|
|align=center|1
|align=center|4:59
|Prague, Czech Republic
|
|-
| Loss
| align=center| 11–2
| Alex Oliveira
| KO (punches)
| UFC Fight Night: Santos vs. Anders
| 
| align=center| 1
| align=center| 0:39
| São Paulo, Brazil
|
|-
| Win
| align=center| 11–1
| Bradley Scott
| Decision (split)
| UFC Fight Night: Thompson vs. Till
| 
| align=center| 3
| align=center| 5:00
| Liverpool, England
|
|-
| Win
| align=center| 10–1
| Nicolas Dalby
| Decision (split)
| Cage Warriors 93
| 
| align=center| 3
| align=center| 5:00
| Gothenburg, Sweden
|
|-
| Win
| align=center| 9–1
| Mircea Dumitrescu
| Submission (arm-triangle choke)
| RXF 29: All Stars
| 
| align=center| 1
| align=center| 2:39
| Brașov, Romania
|
|-
| Win
| align=center| 8–1
| Pavel Pinzul
| Submission (rear-naked choke)
| Magnum Fighting Championship 2
| 
| align=center| 1
| align=center| 2:30
| Rome, Italy
|
|-
| Win
| align=center|7–1
| Matteo Capaccioli
| TKO (punches and elbows)
| Venator Fight Night 1
| 
| align=center| 1
| align=center| 2:25
| Rimini, Italy
|
|-
| Win
| align=center| 6–1
| Orlando D'Ambrosio
| Submission (guillotine choke)
| Magnum Fighting Championship 1
| 
| align=center| 2
| align=center| 3:26
| Rome, Italy
|
|-
| Win
| align=center| 5–1
| Matúš Juráček
| Decision (unanimous)
| X Fight Nights
| 
| align=center| 3
| align=center| 5:00
| Prague, Czech Republic
|
|-
| Win
| align=center| 4–1
| Virgiliu Frăsineac
| Decision (unanimous)
| Fight or Nothing: Road to Bellator
| 
| align=center| 3
| align=center| 5:00
| Lugano, Switzerland
|
|-
| Loss
| align=center| 3–1
| Yuki Okano
| Decision (split)
| Real Fight Championship 3
| 
| align=center| 2
| align=center| 5:00
| Yokohama, Japan
|
|-
| Win
| align=center| 3–0
| Angelo Rubino
| Submission (armbar)
| Hells Angels Eternal City: 2nd Bikes and Fights Night
| 
| align=center| 1
| align=center| 3:51
| Rome, Italy
|
|-
| Win
| align=center| 2–0
| Giuseppe Tivolesi
| TKO
| Storm 9: Pennese vs. Sircu
| 
| align=center| 1
| align=center| 1:44
| Rome, Italy
|
|-
| Win
| align=center| 1–0
| Gianmarco Romeo
| TKO (punches)
| White Rex: Tana Delle Tigri 2
| 
| align=center| 2
| align=center| 2:10
| Rome, Italy
|
|-

See also 

 List of male mixed martial artists

References

External links 
 
 

Living people
1993 births
Italian male mixed martial artists
Welterweight mixed martial artists
Italian male karateka
Italian practitioners of Brazilian jiu-jitsu
Mixed martial artists utilizing karate
Mixed martial artists utilizing kūdō
Mixed martial artists utilizing Brazilian jiu-jitsu
People from Miami
Italian people of Panamanian descent
Mixed martial artists from Florida
Ultimate Fighting Championship male fighters